Sitnik is a gender-neutral Slavic surname and toponym. Notable people with the surname include:

 Ksenia Sitnik (born 1995), Belarusian singer
 Marek Sitnik (born 1975), Polish wrestler

Slavic-language surnames